Bianca Dupree, also known as Bianca Bonnie and formerly Young B, is an American rapper, singer, songwriter, and television personality. Born in Harlem, New York, she first gained recognition after being featured on Webstar's 2006 debut album Caught in the Web. The lead single "Chicken Noodle Soup" peaked at number 45 on the Billboard Hot 100 and became Dupree's signature song.

Biography 
Bianca Dupree is from Harlem, New York. At age 16,  she created the 2006 "Chicken Noodle Soup" song with DJ Webstar, and her uncle Da Drizzle created the beat. The song and related dance became a viral hit on YouTube, and by October 2006, the song reached number 45 on the Billboard Hot 100 chart.

In 2015, Dupree joined the supporting cast of the VH1 reality television series alongside friends Cardi B and Mariahlynn on Love & Hip Hop: New York in season six. She was promoted to the main cast in the show's seventh and eighth seasons.

In 2017, she released visuals for her song "Faith In These Brownskins", a response to the line "All I got is faith in these lightskins" in the Summertime Shootout mixtape by Fabolous.

In September 2019, South Korean rapper J-Hope of boy band BTS released a remake of her song "Chicken Noodle Soup" with American singer Becky G.

In January 2020, she was featured on Marriage Boot Camp: Reality Stars with her partner Chozus.

Discography
 The 9th Year (2016)
 10 Plus (2018)
 10 Plus Times 2 (2020)

Filmography

Television

References

External links
 
 

1991 births
People from Harlem
Rappers from Manhattan
American child singers
American women rappers
African-American women rappers
Universal Records artists
Participants in American reality television series
Living people
21st-century American rappers
21st-century American women musicians
21st-century African-American women
21st-century African-American musicians
21st-century women rappers